Dugald Bruce Lockhart is an Anglo-Scottish stage and screen actor, director and writer.

Background and education
A member of the Bruce Lockhart family, Lockhart was born in Fiji in 1968, the son of James Robert Bruce Lockhart (1941–2018), a diplomat, spy, artist, and author, and Felicity A. Smith. His grandfather, J. M. Bruce Lockhart, was an intelligence officer. His great-grandfather, J. H. Bruce Lockhart, and his great-uncles Rab Bruce Lockhart and Logie Bruce Lockhart, were all public school headmasters who played rugby union for Scotland. Another forebear, Sir Robert Bruce Lockhart, was an author and adventurer. His late uncle Sandy Bruce-Lockhart, Baron Bruce-Lockhart, was a politician.

Dugald Bruce Lockhart was educated at Sedbergh School and the University of St Andrews, then trained for a career in acting at the Royal Academy of Dramatic Art.

Career
Lockhart began as a stage actor, working with the Royal Shakespeare Company, the National Theatre and others. Since 1998, he has acted mostly with Propeller, an all-male theatre company of which he is now an associate director. He is also an associate of the Teatre Akadèmia Theatre Company in Barcelona and has directed Romeo and Juliet and As You Like It in Catalan, using new translations by Miquel Desclot. He teaches and directs at drama schools in London, including the Royal Central School of Speech and Drama, LAMDA, and the Italia Conti Academy of Theatre Arts. 

He played David Cameron in The Three Lions, a comedy written by William Gaminara, a role for which he was nominated as best actor by The Stage at the Edinburgh Festival of 2013. Lockhart returned to the role when the play was later staged at the St James Theatre, London, in 2015, and stayed with the production when it moved on to the Liverpool Playhouse.

He is the author of a handbook for actors called Heavy Pencil, and of a thriller, The Lizard, published in 2020.

Family
Lockhart is married to the actress Penelope Rawlins. They have a son called Mackenzie, born in May 2015.

Filmography
Case Histories - Brian Jackson
Walter's War - Captain Coombes
High Plains Invaders - Cornelius Harrington
Hotel Babylon - Tennyson
Foyle's War - Ralph Hammond (A War of Nerves, 2004)
The Bill - Stewart Ryan
Trust - Dougie Baker
Plunge: The Movie - Chas
Midsomer Murders - Greg Tutt (Ring Out Your Dead, 2002)
Simon: An English Legionnaire (2002) - Corporal Muller
Rockface - Gavin (episode #1.2, 2002)
Hart's War (2002) - Capt. Lutz
Brookside - Mark Wilcox (1999–2000)
Wycliffe - P.C. Greener
Bugs - Alex

References

External links
 

1968 births
Alumni of RADA
Alumni of the University of St Andrews
Dugald
English male television actors
Scottish male television actors
Living people
People educated at Sedbergh School